Oethecoctonus is a genus of parasitoid wasps in the family Platygastridae. There are about six described species in Oethecoctonus.

Species
These six species belong to the genus Oethecoctonus:
 Oethecoctonus insularis (Ashmead, 1894)
 Oethecoctonus laticinctus (Ashmead, 1894)
 Oethecoctonus oecanthi (Riley, 1893)
 Oethecoctonus ophrynopus Masner, 1983
 Oethecoctonus pleuralis Masner, 1983
 Oethecoctonus rufus (Kieffer, 1910)

References

Further reading

 

Scelioninae